Crystal Lake is a lake located by Redwood, New York. The outlet flows into Mud Lake. Fish species present in the lake are northern pike, largemouth bass, walleye, yellow perch, rock bass, and bluegill. There is only carry-down boat access on this lake and there is a fee.

References 

Lakes of New York (state)
Lakes of Jefferson County, New York